Inticetus is an extinct genus of Early Miocene odontocete from the Chilcatay Formation, Pisco Basin, Peru.

Description 
Inticetus is distinguished from other archaic heterodont odontocetes by the following features: long and robust rostrum bearing at least 18 teeth per quadrant; the absence of procumbent anterior teeth; many large, broad-based accessory denticles in double-rooted posterior cheek teeth; a reduced ornament of dental crowns; the styliform process of the jugal being markedly robust; a large fovea epitubaria on the periotic, with a correspondingly voluminous accessory ossicle of the tympanic bulla; and a shortened tuberculum of the malleus.

Classification 
Inticetus was judged by Lambert et al. to be sufficiently distinct from other archaic heterodont odontocetes to be placed in a new family, Inticetidae. The authors recovered it as either outside crown Odontoceti or as an early-branching member of Platanistoidea.

Phococetus, previously assigned to Kekenodontidae, is apparently a relative of Inticetus.

References 

Prehistoric toothed whales
Prehistoric cetacean genera
Miocene cetaceans
Miocene mammals of South America
Neogene Peru
Fossils of Peru
Fossil taxa described in 2017